The Meroitic language was spoken in Meroë (in present-day Sudan) during the Meroitic period (attested from 300 BCE) and became extinct about 400 CE. It was written in two forms of the Meroitic alphabet: Meroitic Cursive, which was written with a stylus and was used for general record-keeping; and Meroitic Hieroglyphic, which was carved in stone or used for royal or religious documents. It is poorly understood, owing to the scarcity of bilingual texts.

Name
Meroitic is an extinct language also referred to in some publications as Kushite after the apparent attested endoethnonym Meroitic qes, qos (transcribed in Egyptian as kꜣš). The name Meroitic in English dates to 1852 where it occurs as a translation of German . The term derives from Latin , corresponding to Greek . These latter names are representations of the name of the royal city of Meroë of the Kingdom of Kush.

Location and period of attestation
The Meroitic period began ca. 300 BCE and ended ca. 350 CE. Most attestations of the Meroitic language, via native inscriptions, hail from this period, though some attestations pre- and post-date this period. The Kushite territory stretched from the area of the First Cataract of the Nile to the Khartoum area of Sudan. It can be assumed that speakers of Meroitic covered much of that territory based on the language contact evidenced in Egyptian texts. Attestations of Meroitic in Egyptian texts, span across the Egyptian Middle Kingdom, the New Kingdom, and the late 3rd Intermediate, Late, Ptolemaic, and Roman periods – respectively corresponding to the Kushite Kerman (ca. 2600–ca. 1500 BCE), Napatan (ca. 900/750–ca. 300 BCE), and Meroitic periods. Meroitic names and phrases appear in the New Kingdom Book of the Dead (Book of Coming Forth by Day) in the "Nubian" chapters or spells (162 – 165). Meroitic names and lexical items, in Egyptian texts, are most frequently attested during Napatan Kushite control of some or all parts of Egypt in the late 3rd Intermediate and Late Periods (ca. 750–656 BCE). Both the Meroitic Period and the Kingdom of Kush itself ended with the fall of Meroë (ca. 350 CE), but use of the Meroitic language continued for a time after that event as there are detectable Meroitic lexemes and morphological features in Old Nubian. Two examples are: Meroitic:  "the sun" → Old Nubian: mašal "sun" and Old Nubian: -lo (focus particle) ← Meroitic: - which is made up two morphemes, - (determinant) +  (copula). The language likely became fully extinct by the 6th century when it was supplanted by Byzantine Greek, Coptic, and Old Nubian.

Orthography

During the Meroitic period, Meroitic was written in two forms of the Meroitic alphasyllabary: Meroitic Cursive, which was written with a stylus and was used for general record-keeping; and Meroitic Hieroglyphic, which was carved in stone or used for royal or religious documents. The last known Meroitic inscription is written in Meroitic Cursive and dates to the 5th century.

Classification 

The classification of the Meroitic language is uncertain due to the scarcity of data and difficulty in interpreting it. Since the alphabet was deciphered in 1909, it has been proposed that Meroitic is related to the Nubian languages and similar languages of the Nilo-Saharan phylum. The competing claim is that Meroitic is a member of the Afroasiatic phylum.

Rowan (2006, 2011) proposes that the Meroitic sound inventory and phonotactics (the only aspects of the language that are secure) are similar to those of the Afroasiatic languages, and dissimilar from Nilo-Saharan languages. For example, she notes that very rarely does one find the sequence CVC, where the consonants (C) are both labials or both velars, noting that is similar to consonant restrictions found throughout the Afroasiatic language family, suggesting that Meroitic might have been an Afroasiatic language like Egyptian. Semitist Edward Lipiński (orientalist) (2011) also argues in favour for an Afro Asiatic origin of Meroitic based primarily on vocabulary.

Claude Rilly (2004, 2007, 2012, 2016) is the most recent proponent of the Nilo-Saharan idea: he proposes, based on its syntax, morphology, and known vocabulary, that Meroitic is Eastern Sudanic, the Nilo-Saharan family that includes Nubian. He finds, for example, that word order in Meroitic "conforms perfectly with other Eastern Sudanic languages, in which sentences exhibit verb-final order (SOV: subject-object-verb); there are postpositions and no prepositions; the genitive is placed before the main noun; the adjective follows the noun."

Vocabulary
Below is a short list of Kushite words and parts of speech whose meanings are positively known and are not known to be adopted from Egyptian. Angle brackets represent the graphemes, or orthographic letters, used to write a word, as opposed to the word's phonemic representation. All non-syllabic, non-vocalic signs are written with their inherent  in parenthesis. Since those are known to be vocalic, they are not in parenthesis. Any known  signs resyllabified into coda position are written.
 "man"
 "bread"
 (← *as[V]tu) "water"
-- (plural)
 "born, be born, child of"
 "beget, begotten"
 "woman, lady, female". 
- (ablative)
-- (determinant)
 "great, big"
 "god, deity"
, (later)  "child, son"
 "sun, sun god"
 "king, ruler"
 "feet, foot, pair of feet"
-- (genitive)
 "to love, beloved, to respect, to revere, to desire"
- (locative)/ - (a type of locative)
--, (later) -- (verbal pronominal suffix)
 "a non-filial, non-(grand)parental, non-avuncular-maternal familial relation"

References

Bibliography
Meroitic Newsletter (Paris, Académie des Inscriptions et Belles-Lettres, 1968).
Bender, Marvin Lionel, The Meroitic problem, in Bender, M. L., editor, Peoples and cultures of the Ethio-Sudan borderlands, Committee on Northeast African Studies, African Studies Center, Michigan State University, 1981, pp. 5–32.
Breyer, Francis. (2014). Einführung in die Meroitistik: Einführungen und Quellentexte zur Ägyptologie Bd. 8, 2014, 336 S., br., .
Lipiński, Edward. (2011). "Meroitic (Review article)1" ROCZNIK ORIENTALISTYCZNY, T. LXIV, Z. 2, 2011 (s. 87–104).
Pope, Jeremy W. (2014).The Double Kingdom under Taharqo: Studies in the History of Kush and Egypt, c. 690–664 BC. Leiden: Brill. ISSN 1566-2055.  (hardback).  (e-book). Pp.xx + 327.
Rilly, Claude
——— (2004, March) "The Linguistic Position of Meroitic", Sudan Electronic Journal of Archaeology and Anthropology
——— (2007) La langue du Royaume de Meroe. Paris, Champion. 
——— (2012) - with Alex de Voogt . The Meroitic Language and Writing System, Cambridge University Press, 2012. .
——— (2016). Meroitic. UCLA Encyclopedia of Egyptology, 1(1). Retrieved from https://escholarship.org/uc/item/3128r3sw.
Rowan, Kirsty
——— (2006) Meroitic: A Phonological Investigation. PhD thesis, SOAS (School of Oriental and African Studies) & Rowan, Kirsty. University of London, School of Oriental and African Studies (United Kingdom), ProQuest Dissertations Publishing, 2009. 10731304. "PhD Thesis"
———(2006) "Meroitic - An Afroasiatic Language?"   Working Papers in Linguistics 14:169–206.
———(2011). "Meroitic Consonant and Vowel Patterning. Typological Indications for the Presence of Uvulars". In Lingua Aegytia 19. Widmaier Verlag - Hamburg.
———(2015) 'The Meroitic Initial a Sign as Griffith's Initial Aleph'. Zeitschrift für Ägyptische Sprache und Altertumskunde, (142) 1, pp 70–84.
Welsby, Derek A. The Kingdom of Kush (London, British Museum Press, 1996), 189-195, .

Extinct languages of Africa
Unclassified languages of Africa
Languages attested from the 2nd millennium BC
Languages extinct in the 1st millennium
Languages of Sudan
Kingdom of Kush
History of Nubia
History of Sudan